Claude Pagdett Carter, sometimes known as Claude Paget Carter (23 April 1881 in Durban, Colony of Natal – 8 November 1952 in Durban, Natal) was a South African cricketer who played in 10 Tests from 1912 to 1924.

Shortly after leaving the Durban Boys' Model School at the age of 16, Carter began playing first-class cricket for Natal, and eventually played for them from 1898 to 1923, except for a season with Transvaal in 1910–11. He toured England with the South African teams of 1912 and 1924. He was South Africa's leading bowler in the series against Australia in South Africa in 1921–22, when he took 15 wickets at an average of 21.93.

He played a season of club cricket in Yorkshire in 1905, and later played Lancashire League cricket for Lowerhouse in 1925 and 1926, and represented Cornwall in the Minor Counties Championship in 1930 and 1935.

References

External links

Obituary in Wisden

1881 births
1952 deaths
South Africa Test cricketers
South African cricketers
KwaZulu-Natal cricketers
Gauteng cricketers
Cornwall cricketers